Astoria is a port city and the seat of Clatsop County, Oregon, United States. Founded in 1811, Astoria is the oldest city in the state and was the first permanent American settlement west of the Rocky Mountains. The county is the northwest corner of Oregon, and Astoria is located on the south shore of the Columbia River, where the river flows into the Pacific Ocean. The city is named for John Jacob Astor, an investor and entrepreneur from New York City, whose American Fur Company founded Fort Astoria at the site and established a monopoly in the fur trade in the early 19th century. Astoria was incorporated by the Oregon Legislative Assembly on October 20, 1856.

The city is served by the deepwater Port of Astoria. Transportation includes the Astoria Regional Airport. U.S. Route 30 and U.S. Route 101 are the main highways, and the  Astoria–Megler Bridge connects to neighboring Washington across the river. The population was 10,181 at the 2020 census.

History

Prehistoric settlements 
During archeological excavations in Astoria and Fort Clatsop in 2012, trading items from American settlers with Native Americans were found, including Austrian glass beads and falconry bells. The present area of Astoria belonged to a large, prehistoric Native American trade system of the Columbia Plateau.

19th century 

The Lewis and Clark Expedition spent the winter of 1805–1806 at Fort Clatsop, a small log structure southwest of modern-day Astoria. The expedition had hoped a ship would come by that could take them back east, but instead, they endured a torturous winter of rain and cold. They later returned overland and by internal rivers, the way they had traveled west. Today, the fort has been recreated and is part of Lewis and Clark National Historical Park.

In 1811, British explorer David Thompson, the first person known to have navigated the entire length of the Columbia River, reached the partially constructed Fort Astoria near the mouth of the river. He arrived two months after the Pacific Fur Company's ship, the Tonquin. The fort constructed by the Tonquin party established Astoria as a U.S., rather than a British, settlement and became a vital post for American exploration of the continent. It was later used as an American claim in the Oregon boundary dispute with European nations.

The Pacific Fur Company, a subsidiary of John Jacob Astor's American Fur Company, was created to begin fur trading in the Oregon Country. During the War of 1812, in 1813, the company's officers sold its assets to their Canadian rivals, the North West Company, which renamed the site Fort George. The fur trade remained under British control until U.S. pioneers following the Oregon Trail began filtering into the town in the mid-1840s. The Treaty of 1818 established joint U.S. – British occupancy of the Oregon Country.

Washington Irving, a prominent American writer with a European reputation, was approached by John Jacob Astor to mythologize the three-year reign of his Pacific Fur Company. Astoria (1835), written while Irving was Astor's guest, promoted the importance of the region in the American psyche. In Irving's words, the fur traders were "Sinbads of the wilderness", and their venture was a staging point for the spread of American economic power into both the continental interior and outward in Pacific trade.

In 1846, the Oregon Treaty divided the mainland at the 49th parallel north, making Astoria officially part of the United States.
As the Oregon Territory grew and became increasingly more colonized by Americans, Astoria likewise grew as a port city near the mouth of the great river that provided the easiest access to the interior. The first U.S. post office west of the Rocky Mountains was established in Astoria in 1847 and official state incorporation in 1876.

Astoria attracted a host of immigrants beginning in the late 19th century: Nordic settlers, primarily Swedes, Swedish speaking Finns, and Chinese soon became larger parts of the population. The Nordic settlers mostly lived in Uniontown, near the present-day end of the Astoria–Megler Bridge, and took fishing jobs; the Chinese tended to do cannery work, and usually lived either downtown or in bunkhouses near the canneries. By the late 1800s, 22% of Astoria's population was Chinese. Astoria also had a significant population of Indians, especially Sikhs from Punjab; the Ghadar Party, a political movement among Indians on the West Coast of the U.S. and Canada to overthrow British rule in India, was officially founded on July 15, 1913, in Astoria.

20th and 21st centuries 
In 1883, and again in 1922, downtown Astoria was devastated by fire, partly because the buildings were constructed mostly of wood, a readily available material. The buildings were entirely raised off the marshy ground on wooden pilings. Even after the first fire, the same building format was used. In the second fire, flames spread quickly again, and the collapsing streets took out the water system. Frantic citizens resorted to dynamite, blowing up entire buildings to create fire stops.

Astoria has served as a port of entry for over a century and remains the trading center for the lower Columbia basin. In the early 1900s, the Callendar Navigation Company was an important transportation and maritime concern based in the city. It has long since been eclipsed in importance by Portland, Oregon, and Seattle, Washington, as economic hubs on the coast of the Pacific Northwest. Astoria's economy centered on fishing, fish processing, and lumber. In 1945, about 30 canneries could be found along the Columbia River.

In the early 20th century, the North Pacific Brewing Company contributed substantially to the economic well-being of the town. Before 1902, the company was owned by John Kopp, who sold the firm to a group of five men, one of whom was Charles Robinson, who became the company's president in 1907. The main plant for the brewery was located on East Exchange Street.

As the Pacific salmon resource diminished, canneries were closed. In 1974, the Bumble Bee Seafoods corporation moved its headquarters out of Astoria and gradually reduced its presence until closing its last Astoria cannery in 1980. The lumber industry likewise declined in the late 20th century. Astoria Plywood Mill, the city's largest employer, closed in 1989. The Burlington Northern and Santa Fe Railway discontinued service to Astoria in 1996, as it did not provide a large enough market.

From 1921 to 1966, a ferry route across the Columbia River connected Astoria with Pacific County, Washington. In 1966, the Astoria–Megler Bridge was opened. The bridge completed U.S. Route 101 and linked Astoria with Washington on the opposite shore of the Columbia, replacing the ferry service.

Today, tourism, Astoria's growing art scene, and light manufacturing are the main economic activities of the city. Logging and fishing persist, but at a fraction of their former levels. Since 1982 it has been a port of call for cruise ships, after the city and port authority spent $10 million in pier improvements to accommodate these larger ships.

To avoid Mexican ports of call during the swine flu outbreak of 2009, many cruises were rerouted to include Astoria. The floating residential community MS The World visited Astoria in June 2009.

The town's seasonal sport fishing tourism has been active for several decades. Visitors attracted by heritage tourism and the historic elements of the city have supplanted fishing in the economy. Since the early 21st century, the microbrewery/brewpub scene and a weekly street market have helped popularize the area as a destination.

Its inner circular staircase allows visitors to climb to see a panoramic view of the town, the surrounding lands, and the Columbia flowing into the Pacific. The tower was built in 1926. Financing was provided by the Great Northern Railway, seeking to encourage tourists, and Vincent Astor, a great-grandson of John Jacob Astor, in commemoration of the city's role in the family's business history and the region's early history.

Since 1998, artistically inclined fishermen and women from Alaska and the Pacific Northwest have traveled to Astoria for the Fisher Poets Gathering, where poets and singers tell their tales to honor the fishing industry and lifestyle.

Another popular annual event is the Dark Arts Festival, which features music, art, dance, and demonstrations of craft such as blacksmithing and glassblowing, in combination with offerings of a large array of dark craft brews. Dark Arts Festival began as a small gathering at a community arts space. Now Fort George Brewery hosts the event, which draws hundreds of visitors and tour buses from Seattle.

Astoria is the western terminus of the TransAmerica Bicycle Trail, a  coast-to-coast bicycle touring route created in 1976 by the Adventure Cycling Association.

Three United States Coast Guard cutters: the Steadfast, Alert, and Elm, are homeported in Astoria.

Geography

Climate
Astoria lies within the Mediterranean climate zone (Köppen Csb), with cool winters and mild summers, although short heat waves can occur. Snowfall is relatively rare, averaging under  a year and frequently having none. Nevertheless, when conditions are ripe, significant snowfalls can occur.

Astoria's monthly average humidity is always over 80% throughout the year, with average monthly humidity reaching a high of 84% from November to March, with a low of 81% during May. The average relative humidity in Astoria is 89% in the morning and 73% in the afternoon.

Annually, an average of only 4.2 afternoons have temperatures reaching  or higher, and  readings are rare. Normally, only one or two nights per year occur when the temperature remains at or above . An average of 31 mornings have minimum temperatures at or below the freezing mark. Even with such a cold record low, afternoons usually remain mild in winter. Even during brief heat spikes, nights remain cool. The warmest overnight low is  set as early in the year as in May during 2008.

On average, 191 days have measurable precipitation.

Notes

Demographics

2010 census
As of the 2010 census, 9,477 people, 4,288 households, and 2,274 families were residing in the city. The racial makeup of the city was 89.2% White, 0.6% African American, 1.1% Native American, 1.8% Asian, 0.1% Pacific Islander, 3.9% from other races, and 3.3% from two or more races. Hispanics or Latinos of any race were 9.8% of the population.

Of the 4,288 households,  24.6% had children under 18 living with them, 37.9% were married couples living together, 10.8% had a female householder with no husband present, 4.3% had a male householder with no wife present, and 47.0% were not families. About 38.8% of all households were made up of individuals, and 15.1% had someone living alone who was 65 or older. The average household size was 2.15, and the average family size was 2.86.

The median age in the city was 41.9 years; 20.3% of residents were under 18; 8.6% were between 18 and 24; 24.3% were from 25 to 44; 29.9% were from 45 to 64; and 17.1% were 65 or older. The gender makeup of the city was 48.4% male and 51.6% female.

2000 census
As of the 2000 census,  9,813 people, 4,235 households, and 2,469 families resided in the city. The population density was 1,597.6 people per square mile (617.1 per km). The 4,858 housing units had an average density of 790.9 per square mile (305.5 per km). The racial makeup of the city was 91.08% White, 0.52% Black or African American, 1.14% Native American, 1.94% Asian, 0.19% Pacific Islander, 2.67% from other races, and 2.46% from two or more races. About 5.98% of the population were Hispanics or Latinos of any race.

By ethnicity, 14.2% were German, 11.4% Irish, 10.2% English, 8.3% United States or American, 6.1% Finnish, 5.6% Norwegian, and 5.4% Scottish according to the 2000 United States Census.

Of the 4,235 households, 28.8% had children under 18 living with them, 43.5% were married couples living together, 11.2% had a female householder with no husband present, and 41.7% were not families. About 35.4% of all households were made up of individuals, and 13.6% had someone living alone who was 65  or older. The average household size was 2.26, and the average family size was 2.93.

In the city the age distribution was 24.0% under 18, 9.1% from 18 to 24, 26.4% from 25 to 44, 24.5% from 45 to 64, and 15.9% were 65 or older. The median age was 38 years. For every 100 females, there were 92.3 males. For every 100 females 18 and over, there were 89.9 males.

The median income for a household in the city was $33,011, and for a family was $41,446. Males had a median income of $29,813 versus $22,121 for females. The per capita income for the city was $18,759. About 11.6% of families and 15.9% of the population were below the poverty line, including 22.0% of those under  18 and 9.6% of those 65 or over.

Government
Astoria operates under a council–manager form of city government. Voters elect four councilors by ward and a mayor, who each serve four-year terms. The mayor and council appoint a city manager to conduct the ordinary business of the city. The current mayor is Sean Fitzpatrick, who took office in January 2023. His predecessor, Bruce Jones, served from 2019 to 2022.

Education

The Astoria School District has four primary and secondary schools, including Astoria High School. Clatsop Community College is the city's two-year college. The city also has a library and many parks with historical significance, plus the second oldest Job Corps facility (Tongue Point Job Corps) in the nation. Tongue Point Job Corps center is the only such location in the country which provides seamanship training.

Media
The Astorian (formerly the Daily Astorian) is the main newspaper serving Astoria. The Coast River Business Journal is a monthly business magazine covering Astoria, Clatsop County, and the Northwest Oregon coast. It, as with the Astorian, is part of the EO Media Group (formerly the East Oregonian Publishing Company) family of Oregon and Washington newspapers. The local NPR station is KMUN 91.9, and KAST 1370 is a local news-talk radio station.

In popular culture and entertainment 

Actor Clark Gable is claimed to have begun his career at the Astoria Theatre in 1922.

Leroy E. "Ed" Parsons, called the "Father of Cable Television", developed one of the first community antenna television stations (CATV) in the United States in Astoria starting in 1948.

The early 1960s television series Route 66 filmed the episode entitled "One Tiger to a Hill" in Astoria; it was broadcast on September 21, 1962.

Shanghaied in Astoria is a musical about Astoria's history that has been performed in Astoria every year since 1984.

In recent popular culture, Astoria is most famous for being the setting of the 1985 film The Goonies, which was filmed on location in the city. Other notable movies filmed in Astoria include Short Circuit, The Black Stallion, Kindergarten Cop, Free Willy, Free Willy 2: The Adventure Home, Teenage Mutant Ninja Turtles III, Benji the Hunted, Come See the Paradise, The Ring Two, Into the Wild, The Guardian and Green Room.

A scene in "The Real Thing", episode two of season five (in the 7th year), of the television series Eureka was set in Astoria. The character Jo Lupo parks her vehicle in an unauthorized location while she is meditating on the oceanfront. A tow truck is called to remove the vehicle. A law-enforcement officer whose shoulder clearly displays a patch that reads "Astoria, Oregon" speaks to Jo about the parking violation.

The fourth album of the pop punk band The Ataris was titled So Long, Astoria as an allusion to The Goonies. A song of the same title is the album's first track. The album's back cover features news clippings from Astoria, including a picture of the port's water tower from a 2002 article on its demolition.

The pop punk band Marianas Trench has an album titled Astoria. The band states the album was inspired by 1980s fantasy and adventure films, and The Goonies in particular. That film inspired the title, as it was set in Astoria, the album's artwork, as well as the title of their accompanying US tour (Hey You Guys!!).

Astoria is featured as a city in American Truck Simulator: Oregon.

In the series finale of the TV show Dexter, the title character, Dexter Morgan, ends up in Astoria as the series ends.

Warships named Astoria

Two U.S. Navy cruisers were named USS Astoria: A New Orleans-class heavy cruiser (CA-34) and a Cleveland class light cruiser (CL-90). The former was lost in the Pacific Ocean in combat at the Battle of Savo Island in August 1942, during World War II, and the latter was scrapped in 1971 after being removed from active duty in 1949.

Museums and other points of interest

 Columbia River Maritime Museum
 Astoria Riverfront Trolley
 Clatsop County Historical Society Heritage Museum, located in the Old City Hall
 Astoria Regional Airport
 Clatsop Spit
 CGAS Astoria
 Oregon Film Museum
 Captain George Flavel House Museum
 The Astoria Column (the highest point in Astoria)

Sister cities
Astoria has one sister city, as designated by Sister Cities International:

 Walldorf, Germany, which is the birthplace of Astoria's namesake, John Jacob Astor, who was born in Walldorf near Heidelberg on July 17, 1763. The sistercityship was founded on Astor's 200th birthday in 1963 in Walldorf by Walldorf's mayor Wilhelm Willinger and Astoria's mayor Harry Steinbock.

Notable people

 Grouper, American ambient musician, best known for her critically acclaimed album called Dragging a Dead Deer Up a Hill.

See also
 The Clatsop tribe of Native Americans
 Socialist Party of Oregon § The Finnish Socialists of Astoria
 Western Workmen's Co-operative Publishing Company
 Columbia Memorial Hospital
 Astoria Regional Airport
 Job Ross House
 National Register of Historic Places listings in Clatsop County, Oregon — 44 Astoria structures and districts listed (2020)

Image gallery

References

Sources

Further reading
 Ebeling, Herbert C.: Johann Jakob Astor. Walldorf, Germany: Astor-Stiftung, 1998. .
 Leedom, Karen L.: Astoria: An Oregon History. Astoria, Oregon: Rivertide Publishing, 2008. .
  Elma MacGibbons reminiscences about her travels in the United States starting in 1898, which were mainly in Oregon and Washington. Includes chapter "Astoria and the Columbia River".

External links

 Entry for Astoria in the Oregon Blue Book
 Astoria-Warrenton Chamber of Commerce
 Astoria Documentary produced by Oregon Public Broadcasting

 
1811 establishments in Oregon
Cities in Oregon
Populated places established in 1811
Oregon populated places on the Columbia River
Cities in Clatsop County, Oregon
Port cities in Oregon
Populated coastal places in Oregon